Darwinia pimelioides is a species of flowering plant in the family Myrtaceae and is endemic to the southwest of Western Australia. It is an erect shrub with broadly oblong leaves and heads of drooping flowers surrounded by larger red to pink and green bracts.

Description
Flowering occurs in September and October.

Taxonomy
Darwinia pimelioides was first formally described in 1922 by A. Cayzer and F.W. Wakefield in the Journal and Proceedings of the Royal Society of Western Australia from specimens collected near Midland Junction in 1918. The specific epithet (pimelioides) means "pimelea-like".

Distribution and habitat
This darwinia grows among granite outcrops in the Jarrah Forest and Swan Coastal Plain bioregions of south-western Western Australia.

Conservation status
Darwinia pimelioidesis listed as "Priority Four" by the Government of Western Australia Department of Biodiversity, Conservation and Attractions, meaning that it is rare or near threatened.

References

 

pimelioides
Endemic flora of Western Australia
Vulnerable flora of Australia
Myrtales of Australia
Rosids of Western Australia
Plants described in 1922